The Britten-Norman Trislander (more formally designated the BN-2A Mk III Trislander) is an 18-seat three-engined piston-powered civilian utility aircraft produced in the 1970s and early 1980s by Britten-Norman of Britain. These STOL capable aircraft were produced on the Isle of Wight. They were also produced in Romania, and delivered via Belgium to Britain for their certification. A number of commuter airlines operated the Trislander in scheduled passenger services.

Design and development
Designed by John Britten and Desmond Norman, the Trislander is a further development of Britten-Norman's better-known Islander aircraft in order to give it a larger carrying capacity. In comparison with the Islander, the Trislander has a stretched fuselage, strengthened, fixed tricycle landing gear and a third engine on the fuselage centre line atop the fin. The Trislander has exceptional low speed handling characteristics, extended endurance, increased payload, low noise signature and economical operating costs.

Operational history
The prototype of the Trislander, which was constructed from the original second Islander prototype, first flew on 11 September 1970. The type entered service with the Guernsey-based Aurigny in July 1971. Initial production ceased in 1982 after 73 had been sold and delivered, with a further seven Trislanders unsold, when Pilatus Britten Norman sold a manufacturing license to the International Aviation Corporation (IAC) of Florida. It was planned for IAC to build 12 Trislanders (to be known as Tri-Commutairs) from parts kits supplied by Britten-Norman before undertaking full production, but these plans came to nothing.

Variants
BN-2A Mk III-1 First production version, with short nose.

BN-2A Mk III-2 Lengthened nose and higher operating weight.

BN-2A Mk III-3 Variant certified for operation in the United States.

BN-2A Mk III-4 III-2 fitted with  rocket-assisted takeoff equipment.

BN-2A Mk III-5 III-2 with sound-proofed cabin, modernised cockpit/interior and new engines (proposed, unbuilt as yet).

Trislander M  Proposed military version, not built.

Operators

Future operators

Air Alderney

Current operators

Anguilla Air Services

Roraima Airways

Air Flamenco
Vieques Air Link

Former operators

LIAT

 Aerodata
Air Queensland 

 Lucaya Air

 Burrard Air Ltd.
 Questor Surveys Ltd.

Tavina

Travel Air 

Botswana Defence Force Air Wing 

Cayman Airways 

 Air Pacific
Air Fiji

Aurigny At its peak, Aurigny operated 16 Trislanders, the largest operator of the type. As of 2018 all Trislander aircraft have been retired from service. One of the Aurigny Trislander aircraft is on static display at the Imperial War Museum Duxford in the UK and one of them is displayed at Oaty & Joey's play barn at Oatlands in Guernsey.

Manx Airlines 

Trans-Jamaican Airlines 

Blue Islands 

Air Liberia 

Barrier Air 

Sierra Leone Airways 

 Taiwan Airways

 Turks & Caicos Airways

Air Ecosse 
 Air Sarnia
Emerald Airways 
Lydd Air
Loganair 
 National Airways
 Rockhopper Aero
 Sky Trek
 Willow Air
 XP - Express Parcel Systems

 Air Flamenco
 Air St. Thomas
Air South
Cen-Tex Airlines
Channel Islands Aviation (based at the Oxnard Airport)
 Slocum Airlines
Stol Air Commuter (renamed WestAir Commuter Airlines) 
 Tri Air
Wings Airways 

Vanair 
Unity-Airlines

 Chapi Air 
Sol America

Accidents and incidents
On 5 July 2009, a Trislander belonging to Great Barrier Airlines (now Barrier Air) lost its starboard side prop six minutes into a flight from Great Barrier Island, New Zealand, to Auckland. The prop sheared off and impacted the fuselage, prompting a successful emergency landing. While there were injuries, no deaths were reported. The accident was caused by undetected corrosion of the propeller flange which led to its eventual failure.

On 15 December 2008, a Trislander operated by LAP in Puerto Rico crashed into the sea somewhere near the Turks and Caicos, shortly after a distress call. A spokesman for the Asociación Nacional de Pilotos reported that the pilot had his licence suspended in October 2006.

On 8 October 1977, ZS-JYF, operated by Southern Aviation, impacted the ground while attempting a stall turn during an air display at Lanseria in South Africa. Despite sustaining severe damage (it was damaged beyond repair) the aircraft performed an emergency landing and neither occupant was injured.

Specifications (BN-2A Mk III-2)

See also

References

Further reading

 
 The Illustrated Encyclopedia of Aircraft (Part Work 1982–1985). London: Orbis Publishing, 1985.
 Stroud, John. "Post War Propliners: Islander and Trislander". Aeroplane Monthly. Vol. 22, No. 8. August 1994. pp. 44–49. .
 
 

1970s British civil utility aircraft
Trislander
Trimotors
High-wing aircraft
Cruciform tail aircraft
Aircraft first flown in 1970
1970s British airliners